Harold Patrick Breen  (30 April 18936 July 1966) was a senior Australian public servant. He was head of the Department of Defence Production between 1951 and 1957.

Life and career
Harold Breen was born on 30 April 1893 in Richmond, Melbourne.

He commenced his Commonwealth Public Service career in 1910 in the Department of Defence in the Ordnance Department.

Rising up the ranks, he was appointed Secretary of the Department of Supply and Development in July 1949, and later head of the Department of Supply in 1950.

When the Department of Defence Production was established in 1951, Breen was appointed as its inaugural head. He remained in the position until his retirement in 1957.

Breen died in Malvern on 6 July 1966 and was buried in St Kilda Cemetery.

Awards
Breen was appointed a Commander of the Order of the British Empire in June 1953 during his time as head of the Defence Production Department.

References

1893 births
1966 deaths
20th-century Australian public servants
Australian Commanders of the Order of the British Empire
People from Richmond, Victoria
Public servants from Melbourne